The 18th Annual Kolkata Film Festival was held 10 to 17 November 2012. The Kolkata Film Festival (KFF) is an annual film festival held in Kolkata, India. Founded in 1995, it is the second oldest international film festival in India. The festival is organized by the West Bengal Film Centre under the West Bengal Government. Actors and filmmakers including Amitabh Bachchan, Shah Rukh Khan, Mithun Chakraborty, Dev Adhikari, Katrina Kaif, Anushka Sharma, Chief Minister Smt. and Mamata Banerjee inaugurated the festival at Netaji Indoor Stadium on 10 November 2012.

Categories
Centenary Tribute - Michelangelo Antonioni
200 Years Birth Anniversary : Charles Dickens
Homage
Retrospective - Michael Cacoyannis
New Horizon
Focus : Africa (Now & Then)
100 Years of Indian Cinema
Where is the land
Cinema International
Big Story (Amitabh Bachchan)
Asian Select (NETPAC Award)
Indian Select
Children Screening
Students Shorts
Calcutta/Kolkata
Tribute
Special Tribute : PK Nair

Venues
 Nandan I (For Press, Delegates & Guests) - 9am, 11am, 3pm, 5pm & 7:15pm.
 Nandan II (For Press, Delegates & Guests) - 11:15am, 3:15pm, 5:15pm & 7:30pm.
 Nandan III (For Press, Delegates & Guests) - 11:15am, 3:15pm, 5:15pm & 7:30pm.
 Sisir Mancha - 11:15am, 2pm, 4:15pm & 7:30pm.
 Rabindra Sadan - 11:15am, 3:15pm, 5:15pm & 7:30pm.
 Paradise - 10am & 12:30pm.
 Star - 11:30am, 2:30pm & 5pm.
 Navina - 9:30am & 11:30am.
 Purbasree (EZCC) - 2:30pm, 5pm & 7:30pm.
 Mitra - 11:15am & 8:30pm.
 SRFTI (Main Auditorium)- 12:30pm, 2:30pm & 5:30pm.
 Hiralal Sen Mancha (Adjacent to Rabindra Sadan) - 3pm & 6:30pm.

References

External links
Kolkata Film Festival website

2012
2012 film festivals
2012 festivals in Asia
2012 in Indian cinema
Kolkata International Film Festival